Mahendra Singh Mehta (born 9 December 1955) is an Indian businessman. He is the chief executive of Vedanta Resources plc, a British multinational diversified metals and mining company.

Early life
Mahendra Mehta holds a BE degree in mechanical engineering from the MBM Engineering College, University of Jodhpur (now known as Jai Narain Vyas University), Jodhpur and an MBA from the IIM Ahmedabad, India.

Career
Mahendra Mehta is CEO of Reliance Infrastructure Ltd since July 2014. He has been the CEO of Sesa Goa Limited since 17 August 2013, the CEO of Sterlite Industries (India) Ltd. since 1 April 2011 and the CEO of Vedanta Resources plc since October 2008. He served as the Chief Executive Officer of Hindustan Zinc Limited (HZL), a subsidiary of Sterlite Industries India Ltd. from 15 November 2005 to 30 June 2010.

Mehta joined Sterlite Industries in 2000 and served as senior Vice President of copper business from October 2001 to November 2002. Since November 2002, he was responsible for the marketing of base metals (copper, aluminum, lead and zinc), copper concentrate procurement, zinc concentrate export and tolling and coal procurement as the Commercial-Director (Base metals) before joining in HZL. He served as a Director of marketing and Head of group-marketing of Sterlite Group, a subsidiary of Vedanta Resources plc. He served various positions in the marketing, finance and commercial departments of various companies in the steel industry, including Lloyds Steel Limited where he was in charge of marketing steel products, working capital finance and the cold rolled coils and galvanized steel projects.

References

1955 births
Living people
Businesspeople from Mumbai
Indian chief executives
Indian Institute of Management Ahmedabad alumni
Vedanta Resources